The second season of the Canadian competitive reality television series MasterChef Canada premiered on CTV on February 1, 2015 and concluded on May 24. Filming began in September 2014 and wrapped up in November 2014. Portuguese-Canadian concrete contractor David Jorge won this season. Jorge, who resides on a hobby farm in the Panorama area of Surrey with his wife and two sons, also guest starred in episodes in Season 3 and Season 5, and competed in the MasterChef Canada: All-Star Family Edition 2016 holiday special, of which he was the runner-up. He is currently the oldest winner of MasterChef Canada. 

Following his victory, Jorge teamed up with Top Chef Canada season 3 Matthew Stowe to open up S+L Kitchen & Bar (a steak-and-lobster seafood themed restaurant) operated by the Joseph Richard Group, with three locations open across British Columbia as of spring 2018. In the fall of 2015, Jorge signed on a contract with JRG in a partnership that involves working with Ryan Moreno, CEO of the pub/restaurant chain. The first location opened on 200th Street at 84th Avenue in Langley on January 26, 2016. A second location opened on December 23, 2016 at 200–2070 Sumas Way in the Abbotsford Village Shopping Centre. The third location opened up in South Surrey in June 2017.

This is also the first season to feature a home cook from the west coast of Canada (British Columbia) to compete against a home cook from the east coast (New Brunswick) in the season finale. Additionally, this is the first season to give select competitors the opportunity to win their way back into the competition after originally being eliminated, with Cody Karey being the first to successfully do so.

Season 2 eliminated contestant Christopher Siu, who originally came in 5th place, eventually returned to compete in MasterChef Canada: Back to Win & was crowned the winner. Andrew Al-Khouri, who originally came in 10th place, also returned to MasterChef Canada: Back to Win, placing 4th.

Top 16

Elimination table

In episode 5, Cody forfeited his immunity from his Mystery Box win to cook in the elimination challenge. 
 (WINNER) This cook won the competition.
 (RUNNER-UP) This cook finished in second place.
 (WIN) The cook won the individual challenge (Mystery Box Challenge or Elimination Test).
 (WIN) The cook was on the winning team in the Team Challenge and was directly advanced to the next round.
 (HIGH) The cook was one of the top entries in the individual challenge, but did not win, or received considerable praise during an Elimination Challenge.
 (WPT) The cook was on the losing team in the Team Challenge or did not win the individual challenge, but won the Pressure Test.
 (IN) The cook was not selected as a top entry or bottom entry in an individual challenge.
 (IN) The cook was not selected as a top entry or bottom entry in a team challenge.
 (IMM) The cook did not have to compete in that round of the competition and was safe from elimination.
 (IMM) The cook was selected by Mystery Box Challenge winner and did not have to compete in the Elimination Test. 
 (PT) The cook was on the losing team in the Team Challenge, competed in the Pressure Test, and advanced.
 (NPT) The cook was on the losing team in the Team Challenge, but was exempted from the Pressure Test
 (RET) The cook was eliminated but come back to compete to return to the competition.
 (LOW) The cook was one of the bottom entries in an individual elimination challenge or pressure test and advanced.
 (LOW) The cook was one of the bottom entries in the Team Challenge, and they advanced.
 (ELIM) The cook was eliminated from MasterChef.

Episodes
Season 2 premiered on CTV on February 1, 2015, following its telecast of Super Bowl XLIX. The premiere was originally meant to air on February 8, 2015, but was pushed ahead to air after the game in place of Spun Out, whose second-season premiere was pulled from the slot after cast member J. P. Manoux was charged with voyeurism.

References

MasterChef Canada
2015 Canadian television seasons